Aşağı Çəmənli (also, Ashagy Chemenli and Novoye Chemenly) is a village and municipality in the Beylagan Rayon of Azerbaijan.  It has a population of 1,143.

References 

Populated places in Beylagan District